Takehito (written: 武人, 威仁, 健人, 健仁, 岳人 or たけひと in hiragana) is a masculine Japanese given name. Notable people with the name include:

 (1862–1913), Japanese prince and Imperial Japanese Navy admiral
 (born 1979), Japanese baseball player
 (born 1967), Japanese voice actor
 (born 1981), Japanese footballer
 (born 1971), Japanese footballer

Japanese masculine given names